Minerva and Daniel DeLand House was built in 1856 in the village of Fairport, New York as a home for Minerva and Daniel DeLand.  DeLand was a member of an influential local family and was a baking soda manufacturer. It is located at 185 North Main Street, at the intersection of North Main street and Whitney Road.

Description
The wood shingled Italianate building has a wood front porch, three chimneys, decorative corbels, and original doors and windows. The house also has four Italian marble fireplaces and two slate fireplaces. West of the house is a historic barn with a cupola and two large bays facing Whitney Road to the north. It was one of the first houses in the region to have indoor plumbing, including a rainwater cistern.

References

"Perinton, Fairport, and the Erie Canal" By Betty Bantle, Perinton Historical Society (Perinton, N.Y.), page 46

External links
https://www.perintonhistoricalsociety.org/history/preservation/daniel-a-minerva-deland
https://www.perintonhistoricalsociety.org/images/stories/Historigrams/Historigram2019-05.pdf

Second Empire architecture in New York (state)
Houses completed in 1856
Houses on the National Register of Historic Places in New York (state)
Houses in Monroe County, New York
National Register of Historic Places in Monroe County, New York